1830: The Game of Railroads and Robber Barons is a railroad operations and share trading board game first published by Avalon Hill in 1986 based on an original design by Francis Tresham. The popularity of 1830 spawned an industry creating similar "18XX" games.  1830 was republished in 2011 through a partnership of Mayfair Games and Lookout Games.

Game Structure
1830 is a strategy game where the only element of luck involved is in determining the initial play order. The game takes the basic mechanics from Francis Tresham’s 1829, with players seeking to make the most money by buying and selling stock in various rail transport companies located on a stylised eastern United States map. Players also operate any companies of which they are the President (by virtue of being the dominant shareholder), in order to generate revenue and affect stock prices.

The game is designed to represent the beginning of railroad operations in the eastern United States beginning in the year 1830, with stock companies in the game representing historical railroad companies.

The goal of the game is to maximise personal wealth before the game ends, whether by nurturing a railroad  company to increase its stock value, gutting it and running with the money, successful stock trading or arranging for another player to go bankrupt. Buying, trading and speculating on the stock market is often where 1830 is won or lost.

A game is finished when the bank runs out of money or any player goes bankrupt, with the player with the greatest personal wealth winning.

Private Companies
 Schuylkill Valley Navigation Co.
 Champlain & St. Lawrence Railroad
 Delaware & Hudson Railroad
 Mohawk & Hudson Railroad
 Camden & Amboy Railroad
 Baltimore & Ohio Railroad

Stock Companies
 Baltimore & Ohio Railroad
 Boston & Maine Railroad
 Canadian Pacific Railroad
 Chesapeake & Ohio Railroad
 Erie Railroad
 New York Central Railroad
 New York, New Haven & Hartford Railroad
 Pennsylvania Railroad

Computer Game

1830 has been translated as a PC game of the same name by Simtex in 1993. This game has been praised for superior computer AI and, due to the lack of randomness in 1830 game play, the transparency of game play.

Reception
Grant Tavinor, writing in The Aesthetics of Videogames, described the game as "extremely complicated".

Reviews
1830 was also reviewed in the 36th issue of Casus Belli.

References

External links
 1830 game information on Blackwater Station
 
 1830 Articles A collection of articles on the game and game strategy.

30
Avalon Hill games
Board games introduced in 1986
Francis Tresham games
Mayfair Games games
Multiplayer hotseat games
1830 in rail transport